Michael Stuart Rosenfeld (June 28, 1934 – March 25, 2010) was a talent agent, movie producer, and co-founder of Creative Artists Agency.

Early life
Rosenfeld was born in Philadelphia to Maxwell S. Rosenfeld, who became a Pennsylvania state senator, and Edith Rosenfeld. He graduated from Lower Merion High School and Pennsylvania State University, where he earned his bachelor's degree. He was of Jewish descent.

Career
In 1975, Rosenfeld, Michael Ovitz, Bill Haber, Ronald Meyer, and Rowland Perkins left the William Morris Agency left to form CAA.

Later life 
In 1986, Rosenfeld left CAA to become an executive producer of films, including Thrashin', Flowers in the Attic, and work in television with Emmy-nominated Case of the Hillside Stranglers. He moved to Sonoma Valley to share his love of flight, giving new pilots their instrument rating and sending them on their way to their pilots license. He continued his close friendships with Ronald Meyer and industry friends.

Death
He died of respiratory failure at a Santa Monica, California hospital. He is survived by his sons Michael A. Rosenfeld, Max Rosenfeld, Jackson Rosenfeld, and his daughter Molly Rosenfeld.

Notes

External links
 

1934 births
2010 deaths
20th-century American Jews
21st-century American Jews
American company founders
American talent agents
Deaths from respiratory failure
Lower Merion High School alumni
Pennsylvania State University alumni
People from Philadelphia